Darwin on Trial is a 1991 book by law professor Phillip E. Johnson disputing tenets of science and evolution and promoting creationism.  Johnson wrote the book with the thesis that evolution could be "tried" like a defendant in court. Darwin on Trial became a central text of the intelligent design movement, and Johnson has been described as the "father of ID".

Eugenie Scott wrote that, in her opinion, the book "teaches little that is accurate about either the nature of science, or the topic of evolution. It is recommended neither by scientists nor educators." Scott pointed out in a second review that "the criticisms of evolution [Johnson] offers are immediately recognizable as originating with the 'scientific' creationists".

Contents 
The book begins by recounting Edwards v. Aguillard, a US Supreme Court case regarding a Louisiana law requiring that if "evolution-science" is taught in the public schools, the schools must also provide balanced treatment for something called "creation science"; the court deemed the law an "establishment of religion".  Johnson states that an associated amicus curiae brief by the National Academy of Sciences improperly "defined 'science' in such a way that [it was impossible to] dispute the claims of the scientific establishment" and a rule it proposed against "negative argumentation [eliminated] the possibility that science has not discovered how complex organisms could have developed". The book then goes on to give various arguments against evolution.

Reception
Darwin on Trial alerted national media to the creationist movement and their fight against the theory of evolution. In the year after Darwin on Trial was released, many articles about the movement were published in popular newspapers and magazines across the country. Johnson said in an interview in California Monthly that he fully expected to be labeled a "kook" by the academy, but he was "pleasantly surprised" by its reception at Berkeley.

The book initially received more attention from popular media than from the scientific community, although soon after the book was released Eugenie Scott of the National Center for Science Education responded to it, saying "scientific creationists" like Johnson "confuse the general public, by mixing up the controversy among scientists about how evolution took place, with a more general question of whether it took place at all". Stephen Jay Gould gave a harsh review in Scientific American, and the book caught the attention of Nobel Laureate Steven Weinberg. Johnson has since added an epilogue to the book titled "The Book and Its Critics", in the latest edition of Darwin On Trial.

Johnson's claim to impartiality has been contradicted by reviewers who state that "the driving force behind Johnson's book was neither fairness nor accuracy", and that the claim of impartiality is contradicted by Johnson's stated aim "to legitimate the assertion of a theistic worldview in the secular universities". Stephen Jay Gould reviewed the book for Scientific American, concluding that the book contains "...no weighing of evidence, no careful reading of literature on all sides, no full citation of sources (the book does not even contain a bibliography) and occasional use of scientific literature only to score rhetorical points."

Robert T. Pennock rebutted Johnson's belief that science was improperly defined within Edwards v. Aguillard, stating that the dual model of science established by Johnson (either creationism or evolution is correct and true, and by disproving any part of evolution creationism 'wins' by default) is a false dilemma, a type of informal fallacy.

Eugenie Scott has pointed out that the book repeats many arguments by creationists that were previously discredited. Scott further criticizes Johnson's approach, which assumes science and evolution can be treated the same way as a criminal trial.  Scott also points out that Johnson criticizes the theory of evolution for changing to accommodate new data, indicating a profound misunderstanding of this strength of science which must adjust theories in order to explain contradictory or new information, and the false dilemma used by Johnson as well as his use of straw men.

In a second review, Scott again points out that the book is anti-evolution, that Johnson's arguments are recycled from scientific creationism. Scott further states that Johnson lacks familiarity with the specifics and nuances of the field necessary to match the critiques of Darwinism offered by evolutionary biologists, and instead parrots the criticisms made by suspect sources (scientific creationists).

Henry Bauer, Professor of Chemistry and Science Studies at Virginia Polytechnic Institute and State University, reviewed the book, saying Johnson "misleads about science and about what science says about evolution."  Bauer explained, "Johnson lumps evolutionists together as Darwinists...but Johnson doesn't understand that even Darwin's original 'theory' contains at least five separate concepts that can be held independently."  In his case studies, for example, "with the Velikovsky affair, there is much more rhetoric than substance."  Bauer noted that when "archaeopteryx cannot be explained away...Johnson calls it 'a point for the Darwinists, but how important ...?' - as though science were suggesting something else."

Reviews

 
 
 
 
 
 

Creationist
  (press release?)
 
  (not a review)

Footnotes

External links
 Darwin on Trial: Read Free PDF Now - by Phillip E. Johnson

1991 books
English-language books
Intelligent design books